Gagea liotardii is a Eurasian  and North African species of plants in the lily family. It is a bulb-forming perennial up to 15 cm tall. Flowers are generally bright yellow to yellow-green. Its native range stretches from Spain and Morocco to Mongolia.

References

External links
photo of herbarium specimen at Missouri Botanical Garden, collected in Iran
Florealpes, Gagée de Liotard in French with photos
Flora im Bild, Botanik im Bild  /  Flora von Österreich, Liechtenstein und Südtirol /  Röhren-Gelbstern  /  Alpen-Gelbstern  /  Erdbeer-Gelbstern - photos, captions in German
Tela Botanica in French with photos and distribution maps

liotardii
Flora of Europe
Flora of Morocco
Flora of Asia
Plants described in 1829